Imre Erdődy (March 26, 1889 – January 11, 1973) was a Hungarian gymnast who competed in the 1912 Summer Olympics.

He was part of the Hungarian team, which won the silver medal in the gymnastics men's team, European system event in 1912. He also competed at the 1928 Summer Olympics. Erdődy died in a car accident in 1973.

References

External links
profile 

1889 births
1973 deaths
Gymnasts from Budapest
Hungarian male artistic gymnasts
Gymnasts at the 1912 Summer Olympics
Gymnasts at the 1928 Summer Olympics
Olympic gymnasts of Hungary
Olympic silver medalists for Hungary
Olympic medalists in gymnastics
Medalists at the 1912 Summer Olympics
Road incident deaths in Hungary
20th-century Hungarian people